Love, Life and Laughter is a 1923 British silent film, written and directed by George Pearson. For many years the film was thought lost, and was listed as one of the British Film Institute's "75 Most Wanted" lost films. On 2 April 2014, Dutch film institute Eye announced it had discovered a copy.

Plot
An impoverished author and a cabaret girl each have their dream of success, but are happy to wake to each other and reality.

Cast 
Betty Balfour
Harry Jonas
Frank Stanmore
Annie Esmond
Nancy Price
Sydney Fairbrother
Eric Smith
A. Harding Steerman
Audrey Ridgewell
Gordon Hopkirk
Dacia

See also
 List of rediscovered films

References

External links

1923 films
1923 drama films
British drama films
British silent feature films
British black-and-white films
Films directed by George Pearson
1920s rediscovered films
Rediscovered British films
1920s British films
Silent drama films